Sharpjaw bonefish is a common name for several fishes and may refer to:

Albula argentea
Albula glossodonta